Leo van Dongen (2 January 1942 – 17 June 2011) was a Dutch road racing cyclist who competed professionally between 1962 and 1970. He won the Ronde van Overijssel, Ronde van Limburg and Delta Profronde in 1963. He rode the Tour de France in 1964–66 and finished second in two stages in 1965.

References

1942 births
2011 deaths
Dutch male cyclists
People from Drimmelen
Cyclists from North Brabant
20th-century Dutch people